The men's road race at the 1930 UCI Road World Championships was the fourth edition of the event. The race took place on Saturday 30 August 1930 in Liège, Belgium. The race was won by Alfredo Binda of Italy.

Final classification

References

Men's Road Race
UCI Road World Championships – Men's road race